The Italian Federation of Chemical, Energy and Manufacturing Workers , FILCEM) was a trade union representing manufacturing workers in Italy.

The union was founded on 1 February 2006, when the Italian Federation of Chemical and Allied Workers merged with the National Federation of Energy Workers.  Like its predecessors, it affiliated to the Italian General Confederation of Labour.

In October 2009, the union merged with the Italian Federation of Textile and Garment Workers, to form the Italian Federation of Chemical, Textile, Energy and Manufacturing Workers.

General Secretaries
2006: Alberto Morselli

References

Chemical industry in Italy
Manufacturing trade unions
Trade unions established in 2006
Trade unions disestablished in 2009
Trade unions in Italy